Jeffrey C. Walker worked from 1984 to 2005 as CEO and co-founder of CCMP Capital, and JPMorgan Partners, JPMorgan Chase & Co's global private equity, vice chairman of JPMorgan Chase & Co. and chairman of the JPMorgan Chase Foundation. He has subsequently been active in many non-profit and education areas, including Harvard University. He is known as a positive advocate for meditation, yoga and related practices.  He graduated from University of Virginia and Harvard Business School. In 2009, Walker completed Harvard University's John F. Kennedy School of Government program for Senior Executives in State and Local Government as a David Bohnett LGBTQ Victory Institute Leadership Fellow.

References

Directors of JPMorgan Chase
American chief executives of financial services companies
University of Virginia alumni
Harvard Business School alumni
Living people
Year of birth missing (living people)